In certain areas of England, Conservators are statutory bodies which manage areas of countryside for the use of the public.

Establishment, Role and Powers 

Conservators are bodies corporate generally established, and granted their powers, by a Scheme made under the Commons Act 1876 or by a local Act of Parliament.

The exact role and powers of each group of Conservators are defined by their establishing Act and vary, but in general terms their role is to:
 regulate and manage their area for public recreation,
 protect the rights of commoners (if applicable) and
 conserve the natural beauty of their area.

Conservators often have the power to manage the land, and the trees, plants and animals on it, to provide recreation facilities, to control activity within their area, regulate navigation on waterways and to make byelaws.

Membership 

Membership of Boards of Conservators varies according to the terms of the individual legislation that established them. Examples of types of member include those:
 elected by commoners or local residents
 appointed by local councils
 appointed by Universities
 appointed by the Lord of the Manor

Future 

The Commons Act 2006 provided for the establishment of Commons Councils to manage common land. Those provisions of the Act are not yet in force, but the Department of the Environment, Food and Rural Affairs (DEFRA) plans to bring them into force in the spring of 2009. The Commons Councils established under the Act will have a similar role to that of existing Conservators. According to DEFRA's website, Commons Councils will only be established where there is a local wish and will not be imposed. Where a Commons Council is established, the Act provides powers for DEFRA to alter or remove existing management arrangements (which could include Conservators) where they might conflict with the functions granted to a new Commons Council.

Examples of Conservators 
 Conservators of Ashdown Forest
 Malvern Hills Conservators
 Conservators of the River Cam
 Banstead Commons Conservators
 Wimbledon and Putney Commons Conservators
 Tumbridge Wells Commons Conservators
 Mitcham Common Conservators
 Shenfield Common Conservators
 Epsom and Walton Downs Conservators
 Mousehold Heath Conservators
 Conservators of Therfield Heath and Greens
 Oxshott Heath Conservators
 Chislehurst and St Paul's Cray Commons Conservators
 The Common Council of the City of London is the Conservator of Epping Forest
 Cleeve Common Board of Conservators

Similar bodies 
 Dartmoor Commoners' Council
 Greenham and Crookham Commons Commissioners

Notes 

Conservation in the United Kingdom
Conservation in England
English coast and countryside
Environmental organisations based in the United Kingdom